Hugh Doherty is a former Irish terrorist in the Provisional Irish Republican Army (IRA). He is known for his role in the Balcombe Street Siege of December 1975, at the resolution of which he was sentenced to eleven terms of life imprisonment for offences including murder, with a judicial recommendation he serve at least 30 years.

Doherty and fellow members of his active service unit had targeted civilians, tourist attractions, soldiers, police officers, politicians and other establishment figures as part of the IRA's terrorist campaign against Northern Ireland being a part of the United Kingdom.

The Balcombe Street gang, who were named after the London street on which they were arrested after a six-day siege that was broadcast live on television and watched by millions, were responsible for a 14-month campaign of bombings and shootings across the south-east of England.

At his trial at the Old Bailey in 1977 Doherty received eleven life sentences and seven other sentences ranging eighteen to twenty-one years imprisonment. In 1987, Jeremy Corbyn handed a petition to then-prime minister  Margaret Thatcher which demanded better visiting conditions for Doherty and his fellow IRA prisoner Nat Vella, along with "the immediate transfer of Irish political prisoners to prisons near their homes". In May 1998 he was transferred from England to Portlaoise prison in Ireland. Following his transfer Doherty made an appearance at the 1998 Sinn Féin Ard Fheis at which the party accepted the Belfast Agreement, under the terms of which Doherty was later released from prison.

He was born in Glasgow, Scotland, and now works as an artist in Ireland. He is the brother of Sinn Féin MP and MLA Pat Doherty.

References

Irish people convicted of murder
Irish prisoners sentenced to life imprisonment
Irish republicans
Irish republicans imprisoned on charges of terrorism
Living people
People convicted of murder by England and Wales
People from Glasgow
Prisoners and detainees of the Republic of Ireland
Prisoners sentenced to life imprisonment by England and Wales
Provisional Irish Republican Army members
Year of birth missing (living people)